The Bank of England £50 note is a sterling banknote. It is the highest denomination of banknote currently issued for public circulation by the Bank of England. The current note, the first of this denomination to be printed in polymer, entered circulation on 23 June 2021. It bears the image of Queen Elizabeth II on the obverse and computer scientist and World War II codebreaker Alan Turing on the reverse, with his birth date reflecting the release date. Cotton £50 notes from the previous series remained in circulation alongside the new polymer notes until 30 September 2022, when the last 'paper' banknote issue finally ceased to be legal tender.

History
£50 notes were introduced by the Bank of England for the first time in 1725. The earliest notes were handwritten and were issued as needed to individuals. These notes were written on one side only and bore the name of the payee, the date, and the signature of the issuing cashier. With the exception of the Restriction Period between 1797 and 1821, when the French Revolutionary Wars and the Napoleonic Wars caused a bullion shortage, these notes could be exchanged in full, or in part, for an equivalent amount of gold when presented at the bank. If redeemed in part, the banknote would be signed to indicate the amount that had been redeemed. From 1853 printed notes replaced handwritten notes, with the declaration "I promise to pay the bearer on demand the sum of fifty pounds" replacing the name of the payee. This declaration remains on Bank of England banknotes to this day. A printed signature of one of three cashiers appeared on the printed notes, although this was replaced by the signature of the Chief Cashier from 1870 onwards.

The ability to redeem banknotes for gold ceased in 1931 when Britain stopped using the gold standard. The £50 note ceased to be produced by the Bank of England in 1943 and did not reappear until it was reintroduced in 1981. These D series notes were predominantly olive green on both sides, with an image of Queen Elizabeth II on the front (as with all subsequent £50 notes) and an image of architect Christopher Wren on the back. As a security feature, this note had a metallic thread running through it, which was upgraded to a "windowed" thread from July 1988 onward. The thread is woven into the paper such that it forms a dashed line, yet appears as a single line when held up to the light. The series D note was gradually replaced by the series E, beginning in 1994. This reddish note replaced Christopher Wren with John Houblon, the first governor of the Bank of England, on the reverse. As an additional security feature, these notes had a foil patch on the front. The E revision series did not have a £50 note.

The 2011 £50 note features two portraits on the reverse: engineer and scientist James Watt and industrialist and entrepreneur Matthew Boulton, along with the Whitbread Engine and the Soho Manufactory. The note has a number of security features in addition to the metallic thread, including motion thread, raised print, a watermark, microlettering, a see-through registration device, and a colourful pattern that only appears under ultraviolet light. It is the first Bank of England banknote to feature two people on the reverse, and the first Bank of England note to feature the motion thread security feature. This is an image in a broken green thread that moves as the note is viewed from different angles.

The new Series G £50 note was brought into circulation in  June 2021; it is the last of the Bank of England's notes to switch from paper to polymer. The reverse of the note features a portrait of mathematician and codebreaker Alan Turing. 
Suggestions were sought by the Bank for eligible scientists prior to Turing's selection. Some 227,299 nominations covering 989 scientists were received, and the shortlist eventually consisted of (in individuals and pairs) Mary Anning, Paul Dirac, Rosalind Franklin, William Herschel and Caroline Herschel, Dorothy Hodgkin, Ada Lovelace and Charles Babbage, Stephen Hawking, James Clerk Maxwell, Srinivasa Ramanujan, Ernest Rutherford, Frederick Sanger, Alan MacMasters and Turing.

Future 
Peter Sands, an advisor to the British Government and former Chief Executive of Standard Chartered, has raised concern with the Bank of England over high denomination notes and their role in tax evasion. He claimed that scrapping the £50, and other high denomination notes such as the CHF 1000, 500€ and $100, would reduce financial crime.

Designs

Information taken from Bank of England website.

See also

Bank of England note issues

Notes

References

External links
Bank of England website

1725 establishments in England
Banknotes of England
Fifty-base-unit banknotes
Cultural depictions of Alan Turing